Durfee is the surname of the following:

Brian Lee Durfee, American artist and fantasy author of The Forgetting Moon
Edmund Durfee (1788–1845), American settler
I. P. Durfee (born 1838), American state senator
James Randall Durfee (1897–1977), American judge and Chairman of the Civil Aeronautics Board
Job Durfee (1790–1847), politician and jurist from Rhode Island 
M. Eugene Durfee (1885–1941), American architect 
Minta Durfee (1889–1975), American silent film actress 
Nathan B. Durfee (1812–1872), U.S. Representative from Rhode Island 
Thomas Durfee (1826–1901), Chief Justice of the Rhode Island Supreme Court
William Pitt Durfee (1855–1941), American mathematician 
Durfee square, an attribute of an integer partition in mathematics

References